The women's 100 metre backstroke S9 event at the 2012 Paralympic Games took place on 31 August, at the London Aquatics Centre in the Olympic Park, London. The event was for athletes included in the S9 classification, which is for competitors with physical impairments. Ten swimmers took part, representing a total of seven different nations. Australia's Ellie Cole won the gold medal.

Results
Key
 Qualified for next round
AS = Asian record
OC = Oceania record

Heats
Two heats were held, each with five swimmers; the swimmers with the eight fastest times advanced to the final. The heats took place on 31 August starting at 10:38 BST.

Heat 1

Heat 2

Final
Australia's Ellie Cole won the gold medal in a time of one minutes, 9.42 seconds, setting a new Oceania record. Great Britain's Stephanie Millward took silver and Elizabeth Stone won bronze. Eleven time Paralympic champion Natalie du Toit finished fourth.

References

Swimming at the 2012 Summer Paralympics
2012 in women's swimming